Amadeus Flugdienst was a German airline. It operated scheduled domestic passenger services from Frankfurt-Hahn Airport. It was established and started operations in 1996. Operations ceased in July 2004.

References

Defunct airlines of Germany
Airlines established in 1996
Airlines disestablished in 2004
1996 establishments in Germany
German companies disestablished in 2004
German companies established in 1996